The fifth and final season of Yu-Gi-Oh! 5D's lasts from episodes 135 to 154 (with the title Fight for the Future, in the English dub). As the Ark Cradle (also known as the "Divine Temple") descends on New Domino City, the final stage of Yliaster's plan is set into motion. This season uses four pieces of theme music. Certain episodes use the insert song: "Clear Mind" by Masaaki Endoh. Episode 154 uses the insert song: "The Melody of Promises," which is also by Masaaki Endoh.

Yu-Gi-Oh! 5D's was licensed in North America by 4Kids Entertainment, and Seasons 4 and 5 was aired on 4Kids' Toonzai block between February 19 – September 10, 2011. However, a total of 31 episodes were left out (from Seasons 4 and 5) from the original Japanese broadcast, with the English dubbed series ending on September 10, 2011. This was due to a lawsuit from TV Tokyo, though 4Kids claimed that it was due to low ratings.

Episode list

References

2010 Japanese television seasons
2011 Japanese television seasons
5D's (season 5)